The National Cycle Route 725, also known as the Great North Cycleway is a partially-complete regional cycling route that forms part of the National Cycle Network (NCN) in the United Kingdom.

Although some parts of the route are shown on official NCN cycle maps  by the network managers Sustrans, and some parts of the route have been created and signposted by the local authorities that it passes through, large sections of the route are missing or incomplete.

History 
The Great North Cycleway was proposed in 2011 and was initially expected to take two years to complete

The proposed Great North Cycleway is named after the Great North Road, historically the main highway between London and Scotland (until road building in the 20th Century routed motor traffic onto bypasses and motorways and away from urban areas).

In 2015, Newcastle's John Dobson Street was converted from a dual carriageway back into a single carriageway road, using the reclaimed space to create a segregated cycleway, which forms part of the Great North Cycleway.

As of 2019, large sections of the route are still unfinished.

Route 
Between Darlington and Newcastle, the route is largely proposed to follow close to the historic Great North Road, many parts of which are numbered here as the contemporary A167 road.
The proposed route starts in Darlington, heading North close to the A167 road and crossing the over the East Coast Main Line and the River Wear as it approaches Durham. The route follows historic 1930's cycleways north out of Durham.
The route passes through the centre of Chester le Street before crossing under the A1(M) motorway at Birtley and passing the Angel of the North.
The route follows the A167 Durham Road into Gateshead before crossing the River Tyne on the Tyne Bridge.
Next the route passes through the centre of Newcastle, past the Civic Centre and through the Newcastle University campus.
Heading North out of Newcastle, the route follows close to the B1318, to the outskirts of the city, passing Great Park and Hazlerigg  before heading North-East through Cramlington to Blyth.

Links to the National Cycle Network 
The proposed route crosses or meets the existing National Cycle Network several times along its length:
 National Cycle Route 14 in Darlington, Durham and Gateshead. 
 National Cycle Route 7 in Birtley
 National Cycle Route 72 on Newcastle Quayside
 National Cycle Route 10 in Hazlerigg
 National Cycle Route 1 in Blyth

Map 
Map of the route using OpenStreetMap data - Great North Cycleway highlighted on Waymarked Trails

The route is shown on cycle network maps produced by Newcastle and Gateshead councils:
 Newcastle North
 Newcastle South
 Gateshead North
 Gateshead South

References 

National Cycle Routes